Mr. 420 is a 1992 Pakistani Urdu film directed by Umer Sharif. The film starred Umer Shareef, Madiha Shah, Shakila Qureshi, Rubi Niazi, Nisho, and Abid Ali. Mr. 420 won 6 Nigar Awards, including the best film award for the year.

Cast
 Umer Shareef
 Madiha Shah
 Shakila Qureshi
 Rubi Niazi
 Nisho
 Abid Ali
 Tariq Shah
 Nirala
 Chakram
 Majeed Zarif

Release and box office
Mr. 420 was released on 12 June 1992. It was crowned as a golden jubilee hit film.

Awards

References

External links
 

1992 films
Pakistani musical films
1990s Urdu-language films
Nigar Award winners
1992 romantic drama films
Pakistani comedy films